Dallas Green may refer to:

 Dallas Green (baseball) (1934–2017), American baseball player and manager
 Dallas Green (musician) (born 1980), Canadian musician

Green, Dallas